The Old Catholic Church of Croatia or Croatian Old Catholic Church (Croatian: Hrvatska starokatolička crkva) consists of the Croatian parishes in full communion with the Union of Utrecht of the Old Catholic Churches. Since 2018, it is administered by Bishop Heinz Lederleitner.

It should not be confused with some alternative organizations of Old Catholic tradition in Croatia, like the Old Catholic General vicariate of St. Method in Croatia.

History

Old Catholic Church of Croatia was created after First World War and was recognized by state authorities of Kingdom of Serbs, Croats and Slovenes (Yugoslavia) in 1923. Its first bishop was Marko Kalogjera (1924–1956). During Second World War, the Old Catholic Church was banned by the Ustaše regime. Among executed Old-Catholic clerics were: Ante Donković, Davorin Ivanović, Josip Ivelić, Ivan Cigula and Luka Malinarić.  

The Church also suffered from several internal divisions (since 1933), and for a long time it was split in two groups that were finally united in 1974. In spite of that, the Church never recovered fully, and it was placed by the Union of Utrecht under a delegated administration of Bishop Nikolaus Hummel of the Old Catholic Church of Austria (1975–1994), and his successors. Since 18 November 2018, the administrating Bishop is Heinz Lederleitner, current bishop of the Old Catholic Church of Austria.

Croatian Old-Catholic bishops
 Marko Kalogjera (1924–1933–1956)
 Ante Donković elected bishop (1933–1943)
 Vladimir Kos (died 1959)
 Vilim Huzjak (1961–1974)
Administrators:
 Nikolaus Hummel (1975–1994)
 Bernhard Heitz (1994–2010)
 John Okoro (2010–2018)
 Heinz Lederleitner (2018–)

References

Sources

External links
 Across Croatia and Bosnia with two bishops

Croatia
Catholicism in Croatia